An Account of Capers is a novel by Scottish writer Bruce Marshall. His last book, it was published posthumously in 1988.

Plot summary
Set against the background of an Italy poised on the brink of war with Abyssinia in 1935, the story focuses on chartered accountant Arthur Waters. He is sent to Milan to audit the books of an Italian firm. His seemingly straightforward mission becomes somewhat hampered when he becomes involved with the beautiful Emma and the treacherous Bazzini. But his problems really begin when he is mistaken for a British spy and prevented from leaving the country.

References

1988 British novels
Novels by Bruce Marshall
Novels published posthumously
Novels set in Milan
Fiction set in 1935
Novels set in the 1930s
Robert Hale books